Simon Dodd (born 21 May 1968) is an Australian bobsledder. He competed in the two man and the four man events at the 1988 Winter Olympics.

References

External links
 

1968 births
Living people
Australian male bobsledders
Olympic bobsledders of Australia
Bobsledders at the 1988 Winter Olympics
Place of birth missing (living people)